Paco Cabezas (born January 11, 1978) is a Spanish film director and screenwriter, best known for directing The Appeared, Rage and Mr. Right.

Career 
In 2007, Cabezas wrote and directed Spanish language horror film The Appeared, following that, in 2008, he wrote the screenplay for the Spanish horror comedy film Sexykiller. In 2009, he wrote the script for the comedy film Spanish Movie. In 2010, he wrote the script for the romantic drama Bon Appétit and also wrote and directed action comedy film Neon Flesh.

In 2014, Cabezas directed and wrote the first ceremony of the Feroz Awards. He also directed action-crime film Rage starring Nicolas Cage, Rachel Nichols, Peter Stormare, and Danny Glover. Scripted by Jim Agnew and Sean Keller, the film was released on May 9, 2014 by Image Entertainment, and it was Cabezas' American debut film.

In 2015, Cabezas directed an action-comedy romance film Mr. Right based on the script by Max Landis. The film starred Sam Rockwell, Anna Kendrick, Tim Roth, James Ransone, Anson Mount, Michael Eklund and Rza. The film got the closing night premiere at the 2015 Toronto International Film Festival.

Filmography 
 2000 – Invasión Travesti (Director, writer)
 2005 – Neon Flesh (Director, writer) – Short film
 2007 – The Appeared (Director, writer)
 2008 – Sexykiller (Writer)
 2009 – Spanish Movie (Writer)
 2010 – Bon Appétit (Writer)
 2010 – Neon Flesh (Director, writer)
 2014 – I Premios Feroz (Director, writer) – TV special
 2014 – Rage (Director)
 2015 – Mr. Right (Director)
 2016-2019 – Penny Dreadful (Director) – TV series
 2016 – Dirk Gently's Holistic Detective Agency (Director) – TV series
 2017-2018 – Into the Badlands (Director) - TV series
 2017 – The Strain (Director) - TV series
 2017 – Fear the Walking Dead (Director) - TV series
 2018 – The Alienist (Director) – TV series
 2019 – Deadly Class (Director) - TV series
 2019 – American Gods (Director) - TV series
 2019 _ Bye (Director)
 2020 – Penny Dreadful: City of Angels (Director) - TV series
 2022 – In From the Cold (Director) - TV series
 TBD – The Gypsy Bride (Director) - TV series

References

External links 
 

Living people
Spanish film directors
Spanish television directors
Spanish male screenwriters
1978 births
People from Seville